Claude Alphonso Alvares is an Indian environmentalist based in Goa.  Alvares is the editor of the Other India Press and Director of the Goa Foundation, an environmental monitoring action group that has filed successful public interest litigation cases.

Alvares is a member of the Goa Coastal Zone Management Authority of the Ministry of Environment and Forests (MoEF). He is also a member of the Supreme Court Monitoring Committee (SCMC) on Hazardous Wastes constituted by the Supreme Court of India.

Early life 
Alvares was born in Bombay to Mangalorean Catholic parents.  He grew up in Khotachiwadi and attended St. Xavier's College, where he meet his future wife Norma.  In 1976, Alvares completed a PhD from the School of Philosophy and Social Sciences at the Eindhoven University of Technology.  He and his family moved to Goa in 1977.  After starting a short-lived rural development project, Alvares began writing for The Illustrated Weekly of India while Norma studied law.  She completed her degree in 1985.

Goa Foundation 
In 1986, the Parliament of India passed the Environmental Protection Act.  Together with like-minded Goans, the Alvares founded the Goa Foundation in that same year to increase societal awareness and combat evasion of the new environmental standards.  In 1987, the Foundation filed its first public interest litigation case against sand miners who were causing erosion of the local beaches; represented in court by Adv. Ferdino Rebello, the Foundation was successful in halting this activity. The Foundation also filed cases against Ramada and other beach resort developers who were flouting building codes.

Other activism 
Alvares has campaigned against genetically modified crops.  His 1986 Illustrated Weekly of India article "The Great Gene Robbery" criticized the U.S.-funded International Rice Research Institute's program to replace indigenous crop varieties with their own less-robust ones.  He also opposed Monsanto's attempts to market genetically-modified versions of vegetables such as brinjal.

Alvares founded the Other India Bookstore in Mapusa during the 80's; in 1990, he also founded Other India Press to publish books on organic farming, homeschooling, and the environment.

Personal life 
Alvares lives at Parra, Goa with his wife Padma Sri Norma Alvares, an environmental lawyer and their three children, Rahul, Samir and Milind.

Writings

Author
 Homo faber: technology and culture in India, China and the West from 1500 to the present day, The Hague [etc.]: Nijhoff, 1980, New edition: The Hague [etc.]: Nijhoff, 2007 - Indian edition:  De-Colonizing History: Technology and Culture in India, China and the West: 1492 to the Present Day,  - The Other India Press, Goa, 1991 - Paperback Edition: Decolonizing History: Technology and Culture in India, China and the West 1492 to the Present Day, Apex Press, 3rd edition 1991, 
"The Great Gene Robbery", published in the Illustrated Weekly of India in 1986.
 "Science", in: The Development Dictionary, ed. by Wolfgang Sachs, London and New Jersey: Zed Books, 1992, pp. 219–232
 Science, development and violence. the revolt against modernity, Delhi [etc.]: Oxford University Press, 1992
 "Goa may be worse than Bellary", Deccan Herald, Bangalore, 2 October 2011

Editor
 Another Revolution Fails: Investigation into How and Why India's Operation Flood Project Went Off the Rails, Ajanta Publications 1987, 
 Unwanted guest: Goans v/s Du Pont, Mapusa: Other India Press, 1991
 (with Merryl Wyn-Davis) The Blinded Eye: 500 Years of Christopher Columbus, Other India Press, 1993
 Organic Farming Source Book, Other India Press, 1996
 Fish Curry and Rice - a source book on Goa, its ecology and life-style, 4. rev. ed., Mapusa: Goa Foundation, 2002, 
 Multiversity: Freeing Children from the Tyranny of Schooling, Other India Press, 2006,

See also
 Science and technology studies in India

References

External links
 
 Goa Foundation
 Other India Bookstore
 Multiversity
 Green Goa Works
 Organic Farming Association of India

Living people
Writers from Goa
Indian non-fiction environmental writers
Eindhoven University of Technology alumni
Indian editors
Indian technology writers
20th-century Indian non-fiction writers
Indian botanical writers
Year of birth missing (living people)